The 1996 World Jiu-Jitsu Championship, also known as I BJJ Mundials, was an international jiu-jitsu event organised by the International Brazilian Jiu-Jitsu Federation (IBJFF) and held at the Tijuca Tênis Clube in Rio de Janeiro, Brazil on the 3 and 4 February 1996.

History
The 1996 World Jiu-Jitsu Championship was the first international jiu-jitsu event organised by the International Brazilian Jiu-Jitsu Federation (IBJFF). Participants came from the US, Brazil, France, Japan, Holland, Switzerland, UAE, Italy and Cuba. The first ever world black belt match was between Helio "Soneca" Moreira and Octavio “Ratinho” Couto in the light featherweight weight class. While other organisations hold world championships, the IBJJF World Jiu-Jitsu Championship winners are the only ones referred to as Jiu Jitsu World Champions.

Medallists 
Adult male black belt results

References 

World Jiu-Jitsu Championship